Llewellyn Ivor Price (October 9, 1905 – June 9, 1980) was one of the first Brazilian paleontologists. His work contributed not only to the development of Brazilian but also to global paleontology. He collected Staurikosaurus in 1936, the first dinosaur discovered in Brazil.

Biography

Price was born in Santa Maria on October 9, 1905. The son of American parents, he studied chemistry and graduated in zoology and geology in the United States. After being professor at Harvard he returned to Brazil. 

He died of a heart attack in Rio Grande do Sul on June 9, 1980 aged 79.

Awards

 In 1980 he was awarded the José Bonifácio de Andrada e Silva prize by the Sociedade Brasileira de Geologia.

References 
 Book Os Fascinantes Caminhos da Paleontologia. Author : Antônio Isaia. Publisher Pallotti. (Portuguese)
 Book: "Cronologia Histórica de Santa Maria e do extinto município de São Martinho." 1787-1933. Vol I. Author: Romeu Beltrão, Publisher Pallotti, 1958. (Portuguese)

Additional references

External links 
 Llewellyn Ivor Price-Science today
 biography in Portuguese

1905 births
1980 deaths
Harvard University faculty
Brazilian paleontologists
Brazilian people of American descent